Vuletić (Cyrillic script: Вулетић) is a South Slavic surname. Notable people with the surname include:

Bojan Vuletić (born 1971), Serbian musician and composer
Božo Vuletić (born 1958), Yugoslav water polo player
Srđan Vuletić (born 1971), Bosnian film director
Vid Vuletić Vukasović (1853–1933), writer and ethnographer from Dubrovnik
Vukan Vuletić (born 1973), Serbian diver
Daniel Vuletic (born 1973), Italian composer

Serbian surnames
Croatian surnames